Clementsville is an unincorporated community in Teton County, in the U.S. state of Idaho.

History
A post office called Clementsville was established in 1912, and remained in operation until 1941.  The community has the name of the local Clements family.

References

Unincorporated communities in Teton County, Idaho